Tree snail is  a common name that is applied to various kinds of tropical air-breathing land snails, pulmonate gastropod mollusks that have shells, and that live in trees, in other words, are exclusively arboreal in habitat.

Some other species of air-breathing land snails may sometimes be found on tree trunks, or even in the foliage of trees, but this does not mean they live their whole lives in trees, and they are not considered to be tree snails.

Tree snail 
Genera and species that have the words "tree snail" as a part of their common name include: forestry and silviculture are a part of the tree snails habitat 
 genus Achatinella - O'ahu tree snail, 40 species.
 Partula - various species in the genus Partula are known under the common name "Moorean Viviparous Tree Snail" or "Polynesian Tree Snail".
 Samoana - in addition, various species in the genus Samoana are known under the common name "Moorean Viviparous Tree Snail" or "Polynesian Tree Snail".
 Samoana abbreviata - known as the short Samoan tree snail

Treesnail 
Various species have the word "treesnail" as part of their common name:

 Drymaeus
 Drymaeus dominicus (Reeve, 1850) - master treesnail
 Drymaeus dormani (W. G. Binney, 1857) - manatee treesnail
 Drymaeus multilineatus (Say, 1825) - lined treesnail
 Orthalicus reses - the Stock Island treesnail
 Orthalicus reses nesodryas - Florida Keys treesnail
 Orthalicus floridensis - banded treesnail
 Liguus fasciatus (Müller, 1774) - Florida treesnail
 Papustyla pulcherrima - emerald green snail, or green tree snail, or manus green tree snail
Amphidromus asper-large-sized air-breathing tree  snail

See also
 Arboreal locomotion

References 

Mollusc common names
Taxonomy articles created by Polbot